Thaddeus Reynolds Beal (1917-1981) was the United States Under Secretary of the Army from March 8, 1969, through September 21, 1971.

Born March 22, 1917, in New York City, Beal graduated from The Hotchkiss School in Connecticut and received a B.A. degree from Yale University, 1939. He served in U.S. Naval Reserve attaining rank of lieutenant commander, 1941–1945. He received an LL.B. degree from Harvard Law School, 1947 and was  admitted to Massachusetts bar, 1947.  He associated with the law firm of Herrick, Smith, Donald, Farley and Ketchum of Boston, Massachusetts, as associate and later as partner, 1947–1956.  He was president and chief executive officer, Harvard Trust Company of Cambridge, Massachusetts, 1957–1969.  He was active in business and community organizations in greater Boston area as trustee, Cambridge Savings Bank and Boston Personal Property Trust, director of Middlesex Mutual Insurance Company, member of Cambridge Redevelopment Authority, and trustee of Radcliffe College.

In 1972, after his term as Under Secretary of the Army ended, he resumed practice of law as a member of the firm of Herrick, Smith, Donald, Farley and Ketchum. He died May 2, 1981.

References

1917 births
1981 deaths
Hotchkiss School alumni
Harvard Law School alumni
Massachusetts lawyers
United States Navy officers
Radcliffe College people
Yale University alumni
United States Under Secretaries of the Army
20th-century American lawyers